Ignacio Solano Cabello (born 17 June 1977)  is a Spanish (Ceuta) biologist, landscaper and expert on biological interactions. He is recognized for the creation of (and holds the patent for) Vertical Ecosystems, an innovative concept in the design and construction of green walls .

He is the author of the Definitive Guide of the Vertical Garden.

Biography 
Ignacio Solano is the founder of the company Paisajismo Urbano, which designs and constructions green walls, green facades, green roofs and other kinds of bioconstruction.

He discovered his passion for the nature at an early age. Since childhood, Solano watched very carefully the behavior of small animals, especially amphibians and reptiles. His interest in plants grew from that hobby, and his first experiments with them were miniature recreations of natural habitats of these animals.

Thus, he became interested in botany and understanding how plants relate to each other and their environment. He specialized in biological interactions and is dedicated to traveling through jungles around the world to investigate and implement his knowledge. He traveled through the ecosystems of Mexico, North Argentina, Madagascar island, Reunion Islands, Bolivian Chapare, Colombian Choco, Ecuador, Costa Rica and Chile. These expeditions had a great influence on his work methodology.

In 2010, Solano traveled to the jungle of Madagascar to study the behavior of mycorrhizal fungi. The vegetation of this island evolved at a different pace from the African continent, resulting in a very high percentage of endemic species. While there, Solano made the discovery that allowed him to consolidate the concept of Vertical ecosystem: a solution based on fungi and bacteria which gets a much higher rate of success when applied to vertical gardens.

This innovation, coupled with his professional experience and testing performed in his laboratories, allowed him to develop and patent his own system of vertical gardening. With his technology, more than a hundred projects have been developed all around the world.

In 2012, Solano began teaching courses on vertical gardening. His goal when he became a teacher was both to share the knowledge he acquired during years of work and research and to start creating an international network of Vertical Ecosystems builders. Since then he has trained more than 400 students.

In 2016, he published his first book: Definitive Guide of the Vertical Garden.  This is a manual that includes the technical aspects of vertical gardening and situations that may occur during the process of construction vertical gardens. It also includes a guide of species that have proven to work in vertical gardening.

Patented system 
Ignacio Solano is author and owner of the patented system f + p for gardening facades. In turn, he is the inventor of the concept of Vertical Ecosystem, which includes vertical gardens and plant facades that have been developed with this system.

Vertical Ecosystems are based on the conception that vertical gardens resemble the natural ecosystems in their composition and in the way they function (especially those composed by epiphytes). They are composed of different plants that comprise the natural ecosystems, and so they resemble the relationships between the plants and the natural microorganisms. Therefore, conventional gardening concepts can not be applied for vertical gardening. In the words of Solano, "making a vertical garden is not just putting plants on a wall."

Ignacio Solano's patent corrects and perfects the concept of vertical garden designed by French landscape architect Patrick Blanc. The result is a hydroponic system, in which is used a phytogenerant material, the texture, porosity and absorptive capacity of which are suitable to perform the function of substrate. The system is fully automated, and environmental factors, water chemistry and the status of the plants are monitored by automation control. An automated irrigation system continuously supplies the water and micronutrients the plants need.

These improvements enhance the environmental benefits of vertical gardens: generate oxygen and absorb carbon dioxide, trap dust and heavy metals, serve as thermal insulation (saving on air conditioning in buildings) and reduce noise pollution.

Projects 
 2014: Celebra building in Montevideo, Uruguay. 300 square meters.
 2014: Green building in Medellín, Colombia. 288 square meters y 92 meters high. Collaboration with Groncol.
 2013: FPEC, Bolivia. 73 square meters. Collaboration with Leonardo Teran.
 2012: Hotel Gaia B3 of Bogotá, Colombia. 400 square meters. Collaboration with Groncol.
 2012: Shopping center of Quito, Ecuador. 1,000 square meters. Collaboration with Greenstar.
 2012: Armenia shopping center, Colombia. 200 square meters. Collaboration with Groncol.

Research 
Much of the knowledge of Ignacio Solano on plant behavior and relationships between species comes from his experience as a researcher in jungles around the world. In 1998 he made his first trip to Mexico, and since then has gone through different ecosystems. In his travels he is dedicated to find out how plants behave under different conditions and to collect small samples of species.

Highlights his studies of epiphytes plants of tropical understory, as well as the discoveries made in the jungles of Madagascar, which allowed him to develop a formula based on microorganisms that ensures the survival of the vertical gardens.

Publications 
 Definitive Guide of the Vertical Garden (2016): Theoretical and practical manual that describes and analyzes all technical aspects to be considered for the realization of vertical gardens. It includes a guide species of proven success in vertical gardening.

Awards and honours 
 Award Cámara de Comercio a la Investigación (2009).
 Award Iberflora al Mejor Proyecto Sostenible (2011)

References

1977 births
Spanish biologists
Living people